The Keogh Review into patient safety was carried out by Professor Sir Bruce Keogh in July 2013.

This review was ordered by the Prime Minister in response to the Francis Inquiry into poor care at Mid Staffordshire Hospitals NHS Foundation Trust.

14 NHS Trusts which were persistent outliers in measures of hospital mortality were investigated:

 Basildon and Thurrock University Hospitals NHS Foundation Trust
 Blackpool Teaching Hospitals NHS Foundation Trust
 Buckinghamshire Healthcare NHS Trust
 Burton Hospitals NHS Foundation Trust
 Colchester Hospital University NHS Foundation Trust
 The Dudley Group NHS Foundation Trust
 East Lancashire Hospitals NHS Trust
 George Eliot Hospital NHS Trust
 Medway NHS Foundation Trust
 North Cumbria University Hospitals NHS Trust
 Northern Lincolnshire and Goole Hospitals NHS Foundation Trust
 Sherwood Forest Hospitals NHS Foundation Trust
 Tameside Hospital NHS Foundation Trust
 United Lincolnshire Hospitals NHS Trust

As a result of the review six NHS Foundation Trusts were put into special measures by Monitor and five by the NHS Trust Development Authority. Blackpool Teaching Hospitals NHS Foundation Trust, Colchester Hospital University NHS Foundation Trust and The Dudley Group NHS Foundation Trust were not put in special measures.

References

National Health Service (England)